The NASA Space Settlement Contest is an annual design competition for 6-12th grade students sponsored by the NASA Ames Research Center and the NSS (National Space Society). This contest is open to students ages eleven through eighteen from anywhere in the world. Individuals compete as individuals or as part of a team in two categories, in teams of up to six students, and in teams of seven or more students. 

The goal of this contest is to have students learn about science and teamwork while working on projects to develop space settlement designs. Students submit a report about their designs to NASA Ames, and the reports are judged by aerospace professionals. Awards are given for artistic and literary merit. 

Space colonization

The contest is divided into five categories for awarding:

Grand Prize: This category consists of one overall winner, whose project is considered as the finest and most creative. Self researched projects are more encouraged.

1st Prize: This category is divided for all grades from 6th to 12th, ages 11 to 18.